Agama robecchii, commonly known as  Robecchii's agama, is a species of lizard in the family Agamidae. The species is endemic to the Horn of Africa.

Taxonomy and etymology
A. robecchii was discovered by Italian explorer Luigi Robecchi Bricchetti in Somalia, and described by British herpetologist George Albert Boulenger of the Natural History Museum (London) in 1892. Boulenger named the species robecchii in honor of said explorer.

Geographic range
A. robecchii is present in eastern Ethiopia and northern Somalia.

Behavior and habitat
A diurnal and terrestrial species, A. robecchii lives in sandy plains, in holes in the ground.

Description
Agama robecchii has a tail longer than its head and body. The body is not depressed. The head does not show a nuchal crest, only a few spinose, not lanceolate scales. The whole of the dorsum is beset with larger spines, each of which has a ring of smaller spines at its base.

References

Further reading 
Lanza B (1990). "Amphibians and reptiles of the Somali Democratic Republic: check list and biogeography". Biogeographia 14: 407–465. [1988]. 
Largen MJ, Spawls S (2006). "Lizards of Ethiopia (Reptilia Sauria): an annotated checklist, bibliography, gazetteer and identification". Tropical Zoology 19 (1): 21–109.
Largen MJ; Spawls S (2010). Amphibians and Reptiles of Ethiopia and Eritrea. Frankfurt am Main: Edition Chimaira / Serpents Tale. 694 pp. .
Mazuch, Tomáš (2013). Amphibians and Reptiles of Somaliland and Eastern Ethiopia. Tomáš Mazuch Publishing. 80 pp. .

External links
Image on Flickr

robecchii
Agamid lizards of Africa
Reptiles of Ethiopia
Reptiles of Somalia
Reptiles described in 1892
Taxa named by George Albert Boulenger